Vitėnai is a village in Kėdainiai district municipality, in Kaunas County, in central Lithuania. According to the 2011 census, the village has a population of 41 people. It is located 1 km from Kalnaberžė, on the right bank of the Nevėžis river. The regional road  Kėdainiai-Krekenava-Panevėžys runs through the village.

Demography

References

Villages in Kaunas County
Kėdainiai District Municipality